John Anton Long (December 13, 1914 – February 3, 1975) was an American football quarterback in the National Football League (NFL). He played for the Chicago Bears. He played college football for the Colgate Raiders.

NFL career statistics

Regular Season

References

1914 births
1975 deaths
American football quarterbacks
Chicago Bears players
Colgate Raiders football players
People from South Orange, New Jersey
Sportspeople from Essex County, New Jersey
Players of American football from New Jersey